The Fort de la Croix-de-Bretagne is a fortification in the vicinity of Briançon in the Dauphiné region of southeastern France. It was built as part of the Séré de Rivières system of fortifications in 1876–79 to defend France against invasion from Italy, at a cost of 1,416,642 francs. The position was used by the French Army in the defense of Briançon until 1940, when it was part of the Fortified Sector of the Dauphiné.

The position overlooks the earlier Fort des Têtes and, in conjunction with the Grande Maye, was planned to bar an advance from Italy over the Col du Montgenèvre in the vicinity of the Gondrans. The garrison comprised 496 men, serving seven 155mm guns, five 138mm guns and four mortars. Croix-de-Bretagne and the Fort de l'Infernet provided each other mutual support. Built in stone, it was never modernized to deal with explosive projectiles.

References

External links
 Fort de la Croix-de-Bretagne at Chemins de mèmoire
 Fort de la Croix de Bretagne at Fortiff' Séré 

CROB
Alpine Line
Fortifications of Briançon
Séré de Rivières system